A Jenny Haniver is the carcass of a ray or a skate that has been modified by hand then dried, resulting in a mummified specimen intended to resemble a fanciful fictional creature, such as a demon or dragon.

Name
One suggestion for the origin of the term was the French phrase  ("youth of Antwerp"). British sailors "cockneyed" this description into the personal name "Jenny Haniver".

History

Jenny Hanivers have been created to look like devils, angels and dragons. Some writers have suggested the sea monk may have been a Jenny Haniver.

The earliest known picture of Jenny Haniver appeared in Konrad Gesner's Historia Animalium vol. IV in 1558. Gesner warned that these were merely disfigured rays and should not be believed to be miniature dragons or monsters, which was a popular misconception at the time.

The most common misconception was that Jenny Hanivers were basilisks. As basilisks were creatures that killed with merely a glance, no one could claim to know what one looks like. For this reason it was easy to pass off Jenny Hanivers as these creatures, which were still widely feared in the 16th century.

In Veracruz, Jenny Hanivers are considered to have magical powers and are employed by curanderos in their rituals. This tradition is similar to one in Japan, where fake taxidermy ningyo (similar to Fiji mermaids) were produced and kept in temples.

Gallery

In popular culture 
 The Jenny Haniver and Jenny Haniver II are airships in the Mortal Engines Quartet (2001–2006) series of novels by Philip Reeve, and a boat in one of its prequels, A Web of Air (2010).
 The Bermuda Depths, a 1978 fantasy film starring Leigh McCloskey and Connie Sellecca, featured the latter as a mysterious character named "Jennie Haniver".

See also 
 Amabie
 Ningyo
 Fiji mermaid

References

Mermaids
Folk art
Taxidermy hoaxes
Rajiformes
Rajidae